Kira-Theresa Underberg (born May 6, 1985 in Hamburg, West Germany) is a German actress and radio play talker.

Since 1994, she speaks for some popular radio plays. In 1999, she took over the voice of Anne in the German radio play version of Enid Blyton's The Famous Five (German title: Fünf Freunde). She continues her work on this series until today. On January 16, 2008 she joined the daytime soap opera Verbotene Liebe in the contract role as Lydia Brandner. Theresa played the role for three years and left the series when she decided to move back to her hometown Hamburg.

However Theresa continued her work as an actress and made her big screen debut with a role in the comedy What a Man, starring next to actor Matthias Schweighöfer. Followed by this was the pilot of the new hour long comedy series  for Sat.1. After a guest appearance in SOKO Köln, Sat.1 gave Es kommt noch dicker a series order. The series premiered on September 10, 2012. From 2015 till 2017 she played the nurse Lizzy Riedmüller in Bettys Diagnose.

Filmography
 Verbotene Liebe (2008–2011, TV series), as Lydia Brandner
 What a Man (2011), as Stine
 SOKO Köln: Ein Schuss, kein Tor (2012, TV series episode), as Frauke Papke
  (2012, TV series, 7 episodes), as Rike
 Tatort: Allmächtig (2013, TV series episode), as Sarah Möltner
 Bettys Diagnose (2015–2017, TV series, 48 episodes), as Lizzy Riedmüller

Radio plays
 The Famous Five (1999–present), as Anne
 Three Investigators: Gefährliches Quiz (2003), as Clarissa
 Ein Fall für TKKG: Der Mörder aus einer anderen Zeit (2001), as Regina
 Ein Fall für TKKG: Der grausame Rächer (1995), as Regina

External links

References 

1985 births
Living people
German radio actresses
Actresses from Hamburg
German soap opera actresses
German television actresses